Pawona Witu is an archeological site near Bishop in Inyo County, California that was listed on the National Register of Historic Places in 1975.  The listing included .  Its location is not disclosed. Archeological sites are often listed on the National Register for their potential to yield knowledge in the future.

According to The Indian Tribes of North America, a 1953 book by John R. Swanton (1873-1958), Pawona Witu was listed by Julian H. Steward (1902-1972) in 1933 as an Indian village site on Bishop Creek below Bishop, near Owens Valley.

References

Archaeological sites on the National Register of Historic Places in California
Inyo County, California
Historic districts on the National Register of Historic Places in California
National Register of Historic Places in Inyo County, California